Thọ Xuân is a district (huyện) of Thanh Hóa province in the North Central Coast region of Vietnam.

As of 2003 the district had a population of 233,603. The district covers an area of 603 km². The district capital lies at Lam Sơn.

References

Districts of Thanh Hóa province